Athelstan Joseph Michael Eavis  (born 17 October 1935) is an English dairy farmer and the co-creator of the Glastonbury Festival, which takes place at his farm in Pilton, Somerset.

Personal life 
Eavis was born in Pilton, Somerset and grew up at Worthy Farm in the village. His father was a Methodist local preacher, and his mother a school teacher. Eavis was educated at Wells Cathedral School, followed by the Thames Nautical Training College after which he joined the Union-Castle Line, part of the British Merchant Navy, as a trainee midshipman. His plan was to spend twenty years at sea, and return with a pension to help subsidise the income from the family farm.

He worked at Mendip Colliery at Nettlebridge or New Rock colliery at Stratton-on-the-Fosse on the Somerset Coalfield for a couple of years to help supplement the income from the farm.

Eavis and his first wife Ruth had three children, (Juliet, Rebecca and Jane) but divorced in 1964. He next married Jean Hayball, with whom he had a son Patrick and a daughter Emily. Jean died of cancer in 1999, and Eavis has since married his third wife, Liz. In common with his parents and second wife, Eavis remains a practising Methodist, although he has also stated that he is "not really bothered" about the existence of God.

Glastonbury Festival 

In 1969, Eavis and his second wife Jean visited the Bath Festival of Blues. Inspired by seeing the performance of Led Zeppelin, Eavis hosted the Pilton Pop Folk & Blues Festival in 1970. The following year a free festival, Glastonbury Fayre was organised by Andrew Kerr and associates, which later developed into the Glastonbury Festival. 

In 2010, the festival's 40th year, he appeared on the main stage at the Festival, with headline artist Stevie Wonder, to sing the chorus of the latter's "Happy Birthday".

At the Glastonbury Festival 2016, at the age of 80, he accompanied Coldplay on stage in a rendition of "My Way".

Political activity 

Eavis has credited a number of influences for his political views, including traditions of nonconformity in his family, as well as his time as a miner, during which he was a member of the National Union of Mineworkers. During the early 1980s he was involved in establishing a local branch of the Campaign for Nuclear Disarmament, and subsequently agreed to make the Glastonbury Festival a fundraiser for CND, as it was from 1981 to 1987.

After recovering from stomach cancer, Eavis stood as a candidate for the Labour Party in the 1997 general election in Wells, polling 10,204 votes. In 2004, however, he suggested that disillusioned Labour voters should switch their vote to the Green Party in protest at the Iraq War, though he returned to supporting the Labour Party in 2010.

In 2005, Eavis was quoted in The Guardian as being a supporter of hunting. "I don't hunt myself, but I support the people who want to hunt. With all that's going on in the world, it was outrageous to ban it." In 2006, he was appointed as President of the Somerset Chamber of commerce and Industry.

In 2011, Eavis was quoted as lamenting the decline in political activity associated with the Glastonbury Festival. He was guest editor of the Western Daily Press newspaper on Glastonbury's 'fallow' weekend, 23 June 2012.

Eavis invited Labour leader Jeremy Corbyn to appear at the 2017 festival, introducing Run the Jewels' set. Eavis supports Corbyn's anti-nuclear and anti-austerity policies, saying "he's got something new and precious, and people are excited about it. He really is the hero of the hour."

Charitable work 
Eavis has apportioned profits from his Glastonbury Festival to support charitable causes, including local projects such as the restoration of the Tithe Barn, Pilton. In November 2008, during an appearance on the BBC Radio 4 programme Desert Island Discs, Eavis stated that the Festival could never lose its licence due to the contribution it makes to the local economy.

In 2009, Eavis starred in a short film to promote Somerset, commissioned by Inward Investment Agency Into Somerset.

Eavis served as vice-president (alongside Rebecca Pow MP) of Somerset Wildlife Trust until June 2018: he stepped down following an online petition criticising his support for badger culling. In response to the petition, Eavis claimed that signatories "probably live in Kensington" and had "never seen a badger".

Honours and tributes 

Eavis holds honorary degrees from the University of Bath (Doctor of Arts honoris causa, 2004) and the University of Bristol (Master of Arts honoris causa, 2006). In the 2007 Queen's Birthday Honours, he was appointed Commander of the Order of the British Empire (CBE) for services to music.

In 2009, Eavis was nominated by Time magazine as one of the top 100 most influential people in the world. In 2012, he was awarded an honorary Master of Arts degree from the University for the Creative Arts.

In 2015, train operator First Great Western named High Speed Train powercar 43026 Michael Eavis. After this was withdrawn, 802013 was named in April 2019.

He was awarded the Freedom of the Town of Glastonbury on 3 May 2022.

See also 
Max Yasgur, American farmer who hosted the Woodstock Festival in 1969

References

External links 
 Interview with Michael Eavis (July 2005)
 

1935 births
Living people
British Merchant Navy officers
Commanders of the Order of the British Empire
English farmers
English Methodists
Glastonbury Festival
Labour Party (UK) parliamentary candidates
People educated at Wells Cathedral School
People from Mendip District
Dairy farmers
Music promoters
English patrons of music